Harding "Hop" Wilson (April 27, 1921 – August 27, 1975) was an American Texas blues steel guitar player. Wilson gained the nickname "Hop" as a devolution of "Harp" due to his constant playing of a harmonica as a child. His low sounding playing gave several of his tracks, even "Merry Christmas Darling", a morose, disillusioned feel.

Early life
Wilson was born in Grapeland, Texas in 1921, learning to play guitar and harmonica at an early age. Acquiring his first steel guitar sometime between the age of 12 and 18, Wilson performed at various Houston clubs. He served in the United States Army and became a private first class. After serving in the Army, Wilson decided to pursue a musical career.

Music career
Wilson began his career performing with Ivory Lee Semien in the 1950s, recording tracks in 1957 for Goldband Records in Lake Charles, Louisiana. 
He was described as having "absorbed not only the black Texas blues as sung and played by the likes of Blind Lemon Jefferson but also the heavily amplified, often wildly distorted, steel guitar sounds of the region's white Western Swing bands."

In 1960, Wilson signed with Ivory Records in Houston. Wilson led recording sessions, but despised touring, and only played locally until his death in Houston in 1975.

Influence
While Wilson's recording career has been characterized as "slight", he did have an influence on a variety of musicians, including Ron Wood of The Rolling Stones, who stated in 1994 "There's another guitar player called Hop Wilson. I got songs that I wrote like 'Black Limousine' from him, those kinds of licks".

Peter Green, founder of Fleetwood Mac, interviewed in 2007 discussing his favourite blues artists, stated "then there's Hop Wilson, a slide guitar player from Houston who used a twin-neck lap steel. He recorded a couple of singles calling himself Pap Hop, and wrote the song Black Cat Bone.  I love his album Texas Steel Guitar Flash."

Wilson's song "My Woman Has A Black Cat Bone" was recorded by Albert Collins, Johnny Copeland and Robert Cray as "Black Cat Bone" on their 1985 combined release Showdown! released through Alligator Records. Their recording features a spoken introduction where Copeland and Collins discussed Wilson starred by Copeland as follows:

Black Cat Bone has since become a popular blues standard and has been recorded by numerous contemporary blues artists including 
Matt Schofield, The Nimmo Brothers and Philipp Fankhauser.

References

1921 births
1975 deaths
Electric blues musicians
Soul-blues musicians
American blues guitarists
American male guitarists
African-American guitarists
Texas blues musicians
20th-century American guitarists
Guitarists from Texas
People from Grapeland, Texas
20th-century American male musicians
20th-century African-American musicians
United States Army soldiers